Neostenanthera robsonii is a species of plant in the Annonaceae family. It is endemic to Gabon.

References

robsonii
Endemic flora of Gabon
Near threatened flora of Africa
Taxonomy articles created by Polbot